Monte Markham (born June 21, 1935) is an American actor. He has appeared in films, television series and on Broadway.

Early life
Markham was born in Manatee County, Florida, the son of Millie Content (née Willbur) and Jesse Edward Markham Sr., who was a merchant. He attended Palm Beach State College before graduating from the University of Georgia with a master's degree in theater. Markham also served 10 years as an officer in the United States Coast Guard during the Korean and Vietnam Wars.

Television
Markham played the dual roles of Luke and Ken Carpenter in the 1967–1968 ABC sitcom The Second Hundred Years, and portrayed Harry Kellem in the original Hawaii Five-O. In 1969–1970, he starred in the television series Mr. Deeds Goes to Town, based on the 1936 movie of the same name.

Markham had the title role in The New Perry Mason (1973–1974). He also had the role of the racing-car-driver-turned-cyborg "Barney Miller" in the second-season episode of The Six Million Dollar Man entitled "The Seven Million Dollar Man", which first aired 1 November 1974. On 9 November 1975, in the third-season episode "The Bionic Criminal", Markham reprised the role – although with the character's name changed to "Barney Hiller". The same year Markham also played the dual roles of Vince Barrett and Rick Hatfield in the Barnaby Jones episode "Doomed Alibi" and portrayed the criminally insane character Pike in the episode "Power Play" in the revival of The Invisible Man.

Markham appeared as Blanche Devereaux's  brother Clayton Hollingsworth on the NBC sitcom The Golden Girls, in two episodes.  From 1989–1992, he played the role of Captain Don Thorpe, senior lifeguard on Baywatch. He narrated several documentary series that appeared on the History Channel in the mid to late 1990s, including The Great Ships, Air Combat, and Combat at Sea.

Stage
One of his earliest stage experiences was at the Oregon Shakespeare Festival in the summer of 1961, where he played Horatio in Hamlet. Markham made his Broadway debut in 1973 in Irene, for which he won the Theatre World Award. He also appeared on Broadway in Same Time, Next Year (1975).

Film
Markham's film work includes Hour of the Gun, Guns of the Magnificent Seven, Midway, Airport '77, and We Are Still Here. He has served as a consultant, director, producer, and narrator for A&E's Classroom, The Great Ships and Air Combat series.

Filmography

Film

Television

Video games

References

External links
 
 Monte Markham interview

1935 births
Living people
People from Manatee County, Florida
Male actors from Florida
American male film actors
American male stage actors
American male television actors
Palm Beach State College alumni
20th-century American male actors
21st-century American male actors